Reticutriton pfeifferianus is a species of predatory sea snail, a marine gastropod mollusc in the family Cymatiidae.

Description 
The maximum recorded shell length is 46 mm.

Habitat 
Minimum recorded depth is 0 m. Maximum recorded depth is 46 m.

Distribution
This marine species occurs in the Gulf of Mexico; in the Indian Ocean off Madagascar and the Mascarene Basin.

References

 Beu A.G. 2010 [August]. Neogene tonnoidean gastropods of tropical and South America: contributions to the Dominican Republic and Panama Paleontology Projects and uplift of the Central American Isthmus. Bulletins of American Paleontology 377-378: 550 pp, 79 pls.

External links
 Reeve, L. A. (1844). Monograph of the genus Triton. In: Conchologia Iconica, or, illustrations of the shells of molluscous animals, vol. 2, pls 1-20 and unpaginated text. L. Reeve & Co., London

Cymatiidae
Gastropods described in 1844